The following highways are numbered 815:

Australia 
  Foundation Road

United States